The 2022 Africa Beach Soccer Cup of Nations was the fifth edition of the Africa Beach Soccer Cup of Nations (BSAFCON), the premier beach soccer championship in Africa contested by men's national teams who are members of the Confederation of African Football (CAF). The championship was originally organised by Beach Soccer Worldwide (BSWW) under the title of FIFA Beach Soccer World Cup CAF qualifier (also informally known as the CAF Beach Soccer Championship). In 2015, CAF became its organisers and began using the BSAFCON title to which the competition was officially renamed the next year. Therefore, this was the 11th edition of the event overall.

The tournament takes place in Mozambique, which was confirmed as the host nation on 16 May 2021; the city of Vilankulo stages all matches between 21 and 28 October 2022. It is happening in only the next calendar year after the previous edition because said edition was postponed due to the effects of the COVID-19 pandemic in Africa.

The tournament also acted as the qualification route for African teams to the 2023 FIFA Beach Soccer World Cup in the United Arab Emirates; with the winners and runners-up qualifying.

Senegal were the defending champions and successfully defended the title after defeating Egypt in the final to secure their 7th title.

Qualification

The 2022 Africa Beach Soccer Cup of Nations qualifying round determined the eight teams that will compete in the final tournament in October.

The fixtures were announced by CAF on 24 June 2022. The matches were played on the weekends of 22–24 July and 5–7 August.

Qualification ties were played on a home-and-away, two-legged basis. If the sides were level on aggregate after the second leg, the away goals rule was applied, and if still level, the tie proceeded directly to a penalty shoot-out (no extra time played).

Entrants
Fourteen teams entered qualifying. The seven winners of the ties qualified for the final tournament, joining one automatic qualifier – the hosts, Mozambique.

Note: The numbers in parentheses show the African ranking of the teams at the time of the qualification round (out of 19 nations).

Matches
Libya withdrew before the first legs were played.

Ivory Coast refused to continue their second leg match in protest of a penalty awarded to Morocco in the final moments of the game, and thus the match was abandoned with the score at 3–3. The outcome was referred to CAF. On 19 August, CAF announced their decision in applying Articles 54 and 56 of Chapter 30 (Withdrawals, Refusal to Play, Replacement) of the tournament regulations, thereby awarding Morocco with a 3–0 walkover victory in the second leg.

|}

Qualified teams
The following eight teams have qualified for the final tournament:

Group stage

Group A

Group B

5th place play-off
The teams finishing in third place in the groups are knocked out of title-winning contention, receding to play in a consolation match to determine 5th and 6th place in the final standings.

Knockout stage
The group winners and runners-up progress to the knockout stage to continue to compete for the title.

Semi-finals
Winners qualify for the 2023 FIFA Beach Soccer World Cup.

Third place play-off

Final

Awards

Goalscorers

Final standings

Qualified teams for FIFA Beach Soccer World Cup
The following two teams from CAF qualify for the 2023 FIFA Beach Soccer World Cup.

1 Bold indicates champions for that year. Italic indicates hosts for that year.

References

External links
Beach Soccer Africa Cup of Nations, at CAFonline.com

Beach Soccer Championship
International association football competitions hosted by Mozambique
2023
2022 in beach soccer
Beach Soccer Cup of Nations